The Catalogue of Galaxies and of Clusters of Galaxies (or CGCG) was compiled by Fritz Zwicky in 1961–68. It contains 29,418 galaxies and 9,134 galaxy clusters.

Gallery

References

Astronomical catalogues
Astronomical catalogues of galaxies
Astronomical catalogues of galaxy clusters